The 1988 LFF Lyga was the 67th season of the LFF Lyga football competition in Lithuania.  It was contested by 16 teams, and SRT Vilnius won the championship.

League standings

References
RSSSF

LFF Lyga seasons
football
Lith